The 1969 New York City mayoral election occurred on Tuesday, November 4, 1969, with incumbent Liberal Party Mayor John Lindsay elected to a second term. Lindsay defeated the Democratic candidate, New York City Comptroller Mario Procaccino, and the Republican candidate, state senator John Marchi.

Lindsay received 42.36% of the vote to Procaccino's 34.79%, a Liberal victory margin of 7.57%. Marchi finished a distant third with 22.69%.

Background
Lindsay, a liberal originally elected in 1965 as a Republican with Liberal Party support, had lost the Republican primary to Marchi but still managed to be re-elected as a Liberal. Lindsay also received the independent ballot line. Procaccino also received the Civil Service ballot line, while Marchi received the Conservative Party ballot line.

Reflecting the three-way split in the race, with each candidate garnering double-digit support citywide, the five boroughs split between all 3 candidates. Lindsay scored a big victory in Manhattan with 67.1% of the vote, while also winning a narrow plurality in Queens with 36.3% of the vote. Procaccino won pluralities by small margins in Brooklyn and the Bronx. Marchi, a state senator from Staten Island, won that borough with 62.0% of the vote.

Lindsay would be sworn into his second and final term in January 1970.

Results
Note: In one of the most unusual primary seasons since the conglomeration of greater New York, the incumbent Mayor (Lindsay) and a former incumbent (Robert F. Wagner, Jr.) both lost their parties' primaries. Procaccino won with less than 33% of the vote against four opponents, which inspired the use of runoffs in future primaries. In the Democratic Primary, Norman Mailer and Jimmy Breslin, running under a platform of secession from the state, finished in fourth place.

In the general election, Lindsay carried Manhattan (the only borough he had carried in losing the Republican primary to Marchi, 107,000 to 113,000) as he did in 1965, but he was only 4,000 votes ahead of giving first place in Queens to Procaccino. Turnout dropped to 2.4 million from 2.6 million in 1965. (In the same election, Lindsay's 1965 opponent Abe Beame was easily returned to his old job of Comptroller.)

 The Lindsay vote was 872,660 Liberal (36.5%) and 139,973 Independent (5.9%).
 Procaccino's vote was 774,708 Democratic (32.4%) and 57,064 Civil Service Fusion (2.4%).
 The Marchi vote was 329,506 Republican (13.8%) and 212,905 Conservative (8.9%).
 By themselves, the straight Democratic and Republican lines added up to less than 50% of the mayoral vote (1,104,214 or 46.2%), but more than the total vote for Lindsay (1,012,633 or 42.4%).
 Procaccino's general election votes on the Democratic line alone (774,708) were slightly fewer than the total votes received by all candidates in the Democratic primary (777,796).
 Lindsay's general election votes on the Liberal line alone (872,660) exceeded Procaccino's total votes on all lines (831,772).

References

Further reading
 Cannato, Vincent, J. The Ungovernable City: John Lindsay and His Struggle to Save New York  (2001) pp 389–42 excerpt
 Klebanoff, Arthur M. "Is There a Jewish Vote." Commentary 49.1 (1970): 43-47.
 Lizzi, Maria C. "" My Heart Is as Black as Yours": White Backlash, Racial Identity, and Italian American Stereotypes in New York City's 1969 Mayoral Campaign." Journal of American Ethnic History (2008): 43-80. in JSTOR
 Morris, Charles R. The Cost of Good Intentions: New York City and the Liberal Experiment (1980)
 Taffet, Jeffrey F. "The Snubs and the'Sukkah': John Lindsay and Jewish Voters in New York City." American Jewish History 97.4 (2013): 413-438. online

Mayoral election, 1969
1969
New York City mayoral
New York